Navarretia peninsularis is an uncommon species of flowering plant in the phlox family known by the common names Baja navarretia or Baja pincushionplant. It is native to southern California and Baja California, where it is an occasional member of the flora in wet spots in mountain forests. It is a hairy, glandular annual herb growing up to about 25 centimeters in maximum height. The leaves are 1 to 3 centimeters long and are divided into many very narrow linear or needlelike lobes. The inflorescence is a head of flowers lined with leaflike bracts. The lavender flowers are just under a centimeter long.

External links
Calflora: Navarretia peninsularis
Jepson Manual Treatment

peninsularis
Flora of California
Flora of Baja California
Natural history of the Peninsular Ranges
Natural history of the Transverse Ranges
Flora without expected TNC conservation status